Dorota Zdanowska (born 4 March 1954) is a Polish rowing cox. She competed in the women's eight event at the 1976 Summer Olympics.

References

External links
 

1954 births
Living people
Polish female rowers
Olympic rowers of Poland
Rowers at the 1976 Summer Olympics
People from Puławy County
Coxswains (rowing)